Consumed by Fire are an American contemporary Christian music brother trio from Wagoner, Oklahoma. They started making music in 2010, with their first album, Something Real, that was independently released. Their second release, Lean on Me, an extended play, released in 2015, with Inpop Records. The songs, "Walk Through the Fire" and "Lean on Me", both charted on the Billboard magazine charts.

Background
Consumed by Fire are a Christian rock brother trio from Wagoner, Oklahoma, where they grew up in the church their parents pastored, leading choir services and other musical functions within the congregation. Their parents are Pastors David Paul Ward and Vonda Sue Ward, who pastor Legacy Family Church, and head N.C.M.I. Training Center. They are lead vocalist and guitarist, Caleb Ward, drummer and background vocalist, Jordan Ward, and lead guitarist, Joshua Ward.

Music history
The brother trio started as a musical entity in 2010, with their first independently released album, Something Real, that was released on July 13, 2010. Their first extended play, Lean on Me, was released on November 13, 2015, by Inpop Records. They released, a single, "Walk Through the Fire", where this peaked at No. 38 on the Billboard magazine Christian Airplay chart. The second single, "Lean on Me", peaked at No. 24 on the Christian Airplay chart, and it peaked at No. 31 on the Hot Christian Songs.

Members
Current members
 Caleb Paul Ward (born February 22, 1993) – lead vocals, guitar
 Jordan David Ward (born November 3, 1989) – drums, vocals
 Joshua Dale Ward (born April 12, 1985) – lead guitar

Discography
Studio albums
Giving Over (March 25, 2016, Inpop)
EPs
Lean on Me (November 13, 2015, Inpop)
Singles

References

External links
Official website 
Jesus Wired interview

American Christian musical groups
Musical groups from Oklahoma
2010 establishments in Oklahoma
Inpop Records artists
Musical groups established in 2010